Lyngby Radio (call sign OXZ) is a Danish coast radio station, operating on MF
 and VHF.
Lyngby Radio stopped HF service on 1 October, 2009. Earlier, Lyngby Radio was one out of four Danish coast radio stations, the others being Skagen Radio, Blåvand Radio and Rønne Radio. All these stations are now remote controlled from Lyngby Radio.

References

Radio stations in Denmark
Coast radio stations
Mass media in Kongens Lyngby
Radio stations established in 1923